MicroDicom is a free DICOM viewer and editor for Windows. It can open DICOM images produced by medical equipment (MRI, PET, CT, ...). It is also possible to open other image formats - BMP, GIF, JPEG, PNG, TIFF, etc. MicroDicom DICOM Viewer is equipped with most common tools for manipulation of DICOM images, and it has an intuitive user interface. MicroDicom also has the advantage of being free for use and accessible to everyone for non-commercial use. You can use MicroDicom DICOM Viewer as PACS (Picture archiving and communication system) client. The viewer easily can query and retrieve images from PACS locations, by using following DICOM protocols: C-ECHO, C-FIND, C-MOVE, C-GET, C-STORE. Also, you can send DICOM images to PACS servers or other computers. It has also been used by the U.S. Department of Veterans' Affairs to get medical data on their state of health.

See also
 Electronic Health Record
 Electronic Medical Record
 Medical imaging
 Medical software
 Picture Archiving and Communication System (PACS)

References

Further reading

External links
 

Medical imaging